MBC Drama is a pan-Arab television channel owned by MBC Group. It was launched on 27 November 2010 as free-to-air with 24/7 Arabic drama series.

The channel runs a variety of different dramas: Egyptian, Syrian, Bedouin and Gulf dramas that are first runs and exclusive runs. MBC Drama is distinguished by the two additional repeats throughout the day.

Programming

MBC Drama from Arab world 
 The Godfather: Club of the East

Idents 
MBC Drama's idents were shot with 1000 - 1500 FPS cameras, providing a smooth slow motion effect.

MBC Drama HD was launched on 1 July 2011.

MBC Drama also airs original Arabic programmes. ,  In 2022, MBC Drama aired the original series Stiletto and Heera.

References

External links

Mass media in the United Arab Emirates
Mass media in Bahrain
Free-to-air
Television stations in Saudi Arabia
Arab mass media
Arabic-language television stations
Mass media in Dubai
Mass media in Manama
Television channels and stations established in 2010
Middle East Broadcasting Center